The Seemanchal Express derailment occurred on 3 February 2019 near Sahdei Buzurg in Vaishali district of Bihar, India.  Six people were killed and more than 30 are injured.

Accident 
Investigations suggest that the derailment happened because of a fracture in the rail line. Because of the sudden impact on the broken rail, the locomotive and a few cars decoupled and left cars derailed and overturned.
A passenger who survived that accident told to media, "I heard a loud bang and fell on the floor of the coach. It was very dark, I couldn't see anything, felt broken glass everywhere".

References 

2019 disasters in India
Derailments in India
February 2019 events in India
Railway accidents and incidents in Bihar
Railway accidents in 2019
Vaishali district
2010s in Bihar